Darvydas Šernas (born 22 July 1984) is a Lithuanian former professional footballer. Šernas has played internationally for the Lithuania national football team.

Career

Club career
In July 2011, he signed a three-year contract with Zagłębie Lubin.

In January 2014, it was announced that Šernas would go to Perth Glory on loan. In his debut for Perth Glory against Melbourne Victory, Šernas scored his debut goal in the 50th minute, only 3 minutes after being substituted into the game. Šernas' goal tied the game at 1–1, and ended the scoring.

Šernas signed for Scottish Premiership club Ross County in 2015, but was released at the end of the 2014/15 season.

On 6 July 2015 it was announced that Šernas had joined Žalgiris Vilnius.

He returned to Žalgiris before 2017 season.

On 16 January 2018 signed to Hapoel Kfar Saba.

At the end of 2019, Šernas announced his retirement.

International career
Šernas won his first senior cap in a friendly match against Estonia on 31 May 2008.

International goals
As of match played 10 June 2017. Lithuania score listed first, score column indicates score after each Šernas goal.

References

Multigroup Alanyaspor'da imza şov!, milliyet.com.tr, 15 January 2016

External links
 Sern: I had never thought in life that I would play an interview in Australia
  
  

1984 births
Living people
Sportspeople from Alytus
Lithuanian footballers
Association football forwards
Lithuania under-21 international footballers
Lithuania international footballers
Lithuanian expatriate footballers
A Lyga players
Russian Premier League players
I liga players
Ekstraklasa players
Süper Lig players
A-League Men players
Scottish Professional Football League players
TFF First League players
Liga Leumit players
Uzbekistan Super League players
FK Dainava Alytus players
FK Vėtra players
PFC Spartak Nalchik players
Widzew Łódź players
Zagłębie Lubin players
Gaziantepspor footballers
Perth Glory FC players
Wigry Suwałki players
Ross County F.C. players
FK Žalgiris players
Alanyaspor footballers
Hapoel Kfar Saba F.C. players
FK Atlantas players
Expatriate footballers in Russia
Lithuanian expatriate sportspeople in Russia
Expatriate footballers in Poland
Lithuanian expatriate sportspeople in Poland
Expatriate footballers in Turkey
Lithuanian expatriate sportspeople in Turkey
Expatriate soccer players in Australia
Lithuanian expatriate sportspeople in Australia
Expatriate footballers in Scotland
Lithuanian expatriate sportspeople in Scotland
Expatriate footballers in Israel
Lithuanian expatriate sportspeople in Israel
Expatriate footballers in Uzbekistan
Lithuanian expatriate sportspeople in Uzbekistan